In the Open may refer to:
 In the Open (1914 film)
 In the Open (2011 film)